Canarium whitei is a species of plant in the Burseraceae family. It is endemic to New Caledonia.

References

Endemic flora of New Caledonia
whitei
Critically endangered plants
Taxonomy articles created by Polbot